Abbotsleigh is an independent Anglican early learning, primary and secondary day and boarding school for girls, located in Wahroonga, on the Upper North Shore of Sydney, New South Wales, Australia.

Established in 1885, on Sydney's lower north shore, the school has a selective enrolment policy from Year 5 upwards. It currently caters for approximately 1,400 students from Transition to Year 12, including 170 boarders from Years 7 to 12.

Abbotsleigh is a member of the Alliance of Girls' Schools Australasia (AGSA), the Junior School Heads Association of Australia (JSHAA), the Association of Heads of Independent Schools of Australia (AHISA), the Australian Boarding Schools' Association (ABSA), and a founding member of the Association of Heads of Independent Girls' Schools (AHIGS).

Abbotsleigh was ranked the top independent school in the state, based on academic performance in 2013–2015.

History
Abbotsleigh was founded by Marian Clarke in 1885 in a small terrace house in North Sydney. The school then moved to Parramatta; first to Honiton House, then to more spacious premises at the corner of Church and Marsden streets, a site now covered by a car park. The school proved successful in Parramatta, but in 1895 Miss Clarke left 80 pupils behind to set out for a year in England to visit her family. The school declined during her absence, and on her return only a small number of boarders remained.

Abbotsleigh's final move was to its current location at Wahroonga in 1898, where Miss Clarke purchased land and built a new school. It is here that Abbotsleigh became the first girls' school in Sydney to have a sports field. Significant buildings that developed over the years include the Marian Clarke building facing the Pacific Highway, Vindin House, Lynton House and Poole House on the junior campus. The last three are listed on the local government heritage register.

Miss Clarke was determined to found Abbotsleigh as an academic school for girls with a full curriculum and strict order of discipline. In other words, a proper school, not a finishing school for ladies (as was typical of the era). The school offered physics and classical subjects, such as Latin; classes that were only offered to boys at the time.

Headmistresses
The following individuals have served as the Headmistress:

Structure 
Abbotsleigh has a total enrolment of approximately 1,400 girls across Years K–12. In 2016, the Senior School campus had an enrolment of approximately 900 girls in Years 7–12. The main high school is divided into the Middle School (Year Seven and Eight), Senior College Archdale (Year Nine and Ten), and Senior College (Year Eleven and Twelve).

Each house group within a year has a tutor, and every year is managed by a year coordinator, and overseen by the Dean of Middle School or Deans of Senior College.

There is also a nearby Junior School, also located in Wahroonga, which houses the Early Learning Centre, Transition and Kindergarten to Year Six. Each year, approximately two-thirds of the incoming Year Seven class at Senior School are from the Junior School, while the rest are drawn from schools in Sydney, from interstate and overseas, having passed selective entry examinations and/or interviews to gain an enrolment place.

The school council is responsible for the school's governance. Glenn N Davies, Archbishop of Sydney, serves as its chair.

Campus

The senior and junior campuses cater for 1400 students in total from Transition to Year 12 (Higher School Certificate).

The Junior Campus is located in Woonona Ave, Wahroonga. Poole House is the oldest building on the campus and features an after-school care and music centre with a number of music rooms for individual lessons and practice. The library, school hall and administration centre are housed in the same block as the junior years' classrooms. In 2002, a new Years 4–6 centre was built surrounding a grassy courtyard featuring an arts facility and a canteen. Sporting facilities include a large oval, outdoor pool, three tennis courts, 2 courtyards, two sets of play equipment and a human-sized chess board. An underground parking facility was built in 2007 with the kindergarten classrooms built above. 

The new Early Learning Centre was completed in January 2010. It includes a new Infants precinct and an Early Learning Centre for the youngest learners from birth to five years old. It is a seventy-place, coeducational centre providing long day care. Girls of the age of 5 are now able to enter the school in the Transition class (preschool age), where they are able to make the smooth transition from preschool to kindergarten. The ELC is run according to the Reggio Emilia principles.

The Senior Campus is at a separate site on the Pacific Highway, and incorporates a number of facilities including a 350-seat auditorium, large assembly hall, Senior Studies Centre, Aquatic Centre and two gymnasiums. Other sporting facilities include 11 tennis courts, three indoor gymnasiums, two weights gyms, two cricket nets, a 25-metre indoor pool and two large ovals used for hockey, touch football and soccer, with one multi-purpose synthetic turf oval and spectator stands. A new library named the Abbotsleigh Research Centre (ARC) was built and officially opened on April 2, 2006. The ARC contains the Library Teaching Room (LTR), a computer room, study and teaching spaces, an archives centre and three seminar rooms. There are over 40,000 books, over 4,000 videos and DVDs and approximately 70 Periodical titles. The ARC has won awards for its unique interior design. The ARC also includes a new Art Centre which has three classrooms, an Arts staffroom and a number of storage spaces. A large outdoor area incorporated into the design, with six tables for students and sails, is often used for a number of school events overlooking the top oval. Vindin House was converted into the Grace Cossington Smith Gallery (named after Old Girl Grace Cossington Smith), with art rooms and gallery exhibitions open to both students and the general public.

In addition to this, a new canteen was built in 2008 to join with the Saturday morning sports canteen, featuring new outdoor café-style eating areas overlooking the oval. The Judith Poole Sports Hall was built in 2015, accommodating three basketball courts or twelve badminton courts, dance studios, change facilities, offices, classrooms and an underground carpark, an award-winning design at the 2018 World Architecture Awards.

Motto and crest
The Abbotsleigh motto, Tempus celerius radio fugit, may be translated from Latin as "Time flies faster than the weaver's shuttle". As the shuttle flies a pattern is woven; the shuttle of time also weaves a pattern of which the threads are people, buildings and events. The motto was given to the school by Miss Marian Clarke, whose family crest was a weaver's shuttle surrounded by the motto, Tempus fugit radio celerit. The school used this form until 1924, when it decided that the ungrammatical Latin should be changed to the present word order, which has been used ever since.

The reference to the weaver's shuttle is also believed by many to be a reference to the "proper" place of women in terms of domestic duties/servitude to men. Some members of the school community have called for the motto to be changed to keep pace with modern views on feminine rights.

The 1934 edition of The Weaver explains the symbolism of the school crest: "the lion for the strength in God, lillies for purity and fish as the symbol of Christianity through baptism."

Associated schools 
Abbotsleigh has a number of international sister schools and exchange agreements with other institutes, including the École Alsacienne in Paris, France, Ohtani High School, Japan, Beijing Yucai School, China, Annette-von-Droste-Hülshoff-Gymnasium in Münster, Germany, Miami's Palmer Trinity School, Moreton Hall in Oswestry, England, Queenswood School in Hertfordshire, England, and Ridley College in Ontario, Canada. Girls have the opportunity to host an incoming exchange student or, in Years 9 and 10, to attend one or more of these schools on exchange for a period of one or two terms.

Abbotsleigh is also unofficially associated as the sister school to The King's School, an independent Anglican day and boarding school for boys in North Parramatta, and Sydney Church of England Grammar School, an independent Anglican day and boarding school for boys in North Sydney.

Curriculum
Abbotsleigh offers an extensive range of subjects. The academic departments are:
 Christian studies
 Drama
 English
 History (Australian, Ancient and Modern)
 Languages
 Mathematics
 Music
 PDHPE
 Science
 Social sciences (Economics, Geography, Business Studies)
 Technology and applied sciences (also known as Design and Technology)
 Visual arts

Abbotsleigh provides a focused academic education, with Maths, Science and English being graded by class from years 7–10. Other subjects, such as languages and music, also place students in streamed classes. In Year 8, students choose elective subjects to study for Years 9 and 10. Students must study Maths, English, Science, PDHPE, Australian History/Geography, and Christian Studies. They may then choose three elective subjects from: Commerce, Elective History, Elective Geography, Design and Technology, Information Software Technology, Music, Drama, Visual Arts, Photography and Digital Media, Chinese Mandarin, French, German, and Latin.

In the Upper School, students have an even wider range of subjects to choose from, which follow the Board of Studies HSC syllabus. Subjects offered include English (Advanced, Extension 1 and Extension 2), Mathematics (General, 2-unit, Extension 1 and Extension 2), sciences (Biology, Chemistry, Physics, Earth and Environmental Science), histories (Modern, Ancient and Extension History), social sciences (Business Studies, Geography, Economics), Music (1, 2, extension), Theology and Studies of Religion(1 and 2 unit) a wide range of languages including French, German, Latin and Japanese, Art, PDHPE, Software Design and Development, Drama, Design and Technology.

Co-curriculum
Students can participate in a number of extracurricular activities. Most girls participate in at least one activity, if not many. Abbotsleigh has a significant number of students achieve the Gold Duke of Edinburgh Award each year, which is presented at the school's Speech Day in December. Additionally students may participate in chess teams, debating, mock trial, public speaking, ski team, jewellery making, ceramics, sewing classes, film club, SRC, Environment Club, and over seven different charity and service groups such as World Vision and Amnesty International clubs. Students from Year 10 are selected to form the charity and service group boards with students taking the positions of president, secretary, treasurer and committee member. The school also has an Agricultural group (Ag Club) where chickens are raised every year for a number of competitions including the Sydney Royal Easter Show.

There is also a dance program of considerable size at the school, with over 500 girls from Kindergarten to Year 11 participating in several types of dance such as street, tap and contemporary.

Sport 
The school participates in Independent Girls' Schools Sporting Association (IGSSA) sports including softball, tennis, swimming, diving, basketball, soccer, athletics, cross country, hockey, netball, water polo, touch football, and cricket, achieving remarkable results. Other offered sports include equestrian, golf, sailing, snow sports and rhythmic and artistic gymnastics. Abbotsleigh employs an extensive sports staff department and provides sports coaches and much of the sport equipment including hockey kits, golf sets etc. It is compulsory for Abbotsleigh girls to take part in PE once a week to enhance their physical activity until Year 11.

Music
Abbotsleigh boasts a rich co‑curricular music program. Its varied instrumental ensembles include Orchestra, Symphonic Winds, Jazz Ensemble, Senior Strings, String Ensemble and Concert Band. Chamber groups such as String Quartets, Flute Ensemble, Brass Ensemble, Guitar Ensemble and Clarinet and Saxophone Ensemble are also available to girls without an audition. Girls are invited to participate in Choir, and may audition for smaller vocal groups such as Vocal Ensemble and Chamber Choir. Girls can also be involved in the Gospel Choir, which performs at various Chapel services throughout the year. These ensembles participate in multiple school-based events throughout the year, as well as eisteddfods and music festivals. There are also opportunities to participate in interstate and international music tours, musicals and gala concerts.

Abbotsleigh also offers an Extended Tuition music program from Kindergarten to Year 12, where girls have the opportunity to learn an instrument (piano, singing, woodwind, brass, strings or percussion instruments) from one of their Peripatetic instrumental teachers. Girls who are involved in this program are also encouraged to participate in their co‑curricular ensembles.

Additionally, Abbotsleigh's Junior School offers a Year 2 String Program, where girls are required to learn either violin or cello. Girls in Year 3 participate in the Year 3 Instrumental Program, where they are introduced to a band instrument, such as flute, clarinet or trumpet. Girls then have the option of continuing these studies in the Extended Tuition music program and Junior School co‑curricular ensembles.

Performing arts 
Abbotsleigh caters for a range of creative talents and provides an extensive performing arts program. In addition to drama classes (compulsory in Middle School), it is offered as a subject in Senior College years and the HSC. Student-directed productions, Middle and Senior School plays, an annual "Shakespeare festival", theatre sports and school musicals are just a few of a plethora of performing arts events in the school calendar. Musicals and plays are often produced and performed in collaboration with neighbouring boys' school Knox Grammar.

Debating and public speaking 
Abbotsleigh has a fine tradition of debating and public speaking and has established a reputation for outstanding results in competitive debating. The school participates in several major competitions, including the Independent Schools Debating Association (ISDA), consisting of 32 private schools, the Archdale Debating Competition established in honour of former headmistress Miss Betty Archdale, also involving over 20 schools and the Sydney Debating Network (SDN). Abbotsleigh has consistently achieved championship results in these competitions, fostered due to extensive coaching and development squad programs. Girls also often debate at representative level in AHIGS and NSW state squads.

Abbotsleigh also participates in several public speaking competitions including Rostrum Voice of Youth, Legacy Public Speaking, SMH Plain English Speaking Award and AHIGS Festival of Speech.

Service programs 
Abbotsleigh nurtures responsible citizenship through its Service-Learning program and leadership opportunities. A number of student-run charity clubs exist within the school, with elected positions such as president, treasurer and secretary. These include Amnesty International, Fairtrade, Interact Club (in collaboration with Rotary), Oaktree, World Vision and Zonta Club (supporting the Hornsby Ku-ring-gai branch of Zonta International).

All Year Nine girls undertake the Duke of Edinburgh International Award, with many achieving the Gold Level in senior years. In Year Ten, all girls are required to participate in a week of service learning, ALE (Abbotsleigh Learning Experience). Such experiences include assisting in house construction in Fiji, undertaking environmental conservation projects on Fraser Island, visiting remote indigenous communities in far North Queensland and volunteering at local non-government organisations such as the Red Cross. In Senior College years, a committee-run Breakfast Club organises termly breakfast functions with a guest speaker. Nearby schools are invited and students participate in discussion and discourse regarding a wide range of social issues, such as freedom of speech, women in medicine careers and mental health and well-being.

Furthermore, a Service Prefect is a member of the executive student leadership, running a Service Council composed of girls selected across year groups and chooses a whole school service theme and project. Abbotsleigh girls can participate in overseas service trips such as visiting St Andrew's School in Hyderabad, India, and the Crossroads Foundation in Hong Kong.

Gallery

House system
The house system was introduced by Miss Everett, and is similarly based upon that of Dr Arnold’s house system at Rugby School. The Weaver for May 1931 explains: "Points are awarded for work, conduct and sport and a shield will be presented annually to the winning House". "The "Malloch Shield", given the following year by A Malloch, was won for the first time by Sturt.

In the junior school there are five houses:
 Blaxland (blue), named after Gregory Blaxland (1778–1853), an Australian explorer and pioneer farmer.
 Lawson (green), named after William Lawson (1774–1850), an Australian explorer.
 Macquarie (red), named after Lachlan Macquarie (1771–1824), the Governor of New South Wales from 1810 to 1821.
 Sturt (yellow), named after Charles Sturt (1795–1869), an Australian explorer.
 Wentworth (purple), named after William Wentworth (1790–1872), an Australian explorer, statesman and lawyer.

In the senior school there are eight houses:
 Chisholm (dark blue), named after Caroline Chisholm (1808–1877), an Australian pioneer.
 Franklin (green), named after Miles Franklin, an acclaimed Australian author.
 Gilmore (brown until 1982, now pink), named after Mary Gilmore (1865–1962), an Australian poet and writer.
 Melba (light blue), named after Dame Nellie Melba (1861–1931), an Australian opera singer.
 Prichard (black until 1990, now purple), named after Katharine Susannah Prichard (1884–1969), an Australian writer.
 Richardson (orange), named after Ethel Florence Lindesay Richardson (1870–1946), an Australian novelist.
 Tennant (yellow), named after Kylie Tennant (1912–1988), an Australian World War II and Great Depression novelist.
 Wright (red), named after Judith Wright (1915–2000), an Australian poet.

The house system has been modified over time to reflect the changing needs of the school, and its increased enrolment. One of the most significant changes occurred in the late 1960s under then Headmistress Betty Archdale. Senior school houses had previously been named after well-known male Australian poets, and Archdale introduced new house names recognising accomplished Australian women. This was the basis for the senior school houses in use today. Houses now compete for the House Choir banner and the Spirit Cup, as well as the Sports Cup.
Since 2008 girls have organised get-to-know-each-other events and House Days where students of the same house assemble at lunch time and have a large "house picnic".

Boarding 
Abbotsleigh has offered boarding since its establishment, and currently caters for boarding students from the greater metropolitan area, rural New South Wales and overseas. The school currently has five boarding houses:
 Hirst, opened in 1980 and 1985. Catering for Year 12 boarders. Now replaced by the newly opened Wheeldon House.
 Lynton, opened in 1969. Catering for Year 7 boarders.
 McCredie, opened in 1990. Catering for Year 9 to 10 boarders.
 Read, opened in 1931. Catering for Year 8 to 9 boarders.
 Wheeldon, opened in 2008. Catering for Year 11 to 12 boarders
There are currently approximately 150 boarders at Abbotsleigh from Years 7 to 12. Boarders make up about one-sixth of the senior school population.

Notable alumnae

See also 

 List of non-government schools in New South Wales
 List of boarding schools in Australia
 List of Anglican schools in New South Wales

References

External links

 Abbotsleigh website

Educational institutions established in 1885
Boarding schools in New South Wales
Anglican secondary schools in Sydney
Anglican primary schools in Sydney
School buildings completed in 1885
Rock Eisteddfod Challenge participants
Girls' schools in New South Wales
Association of Heads of Independent Girls' Schools
Junior School Heads Association of Australia Member Schools
1885 establishments in Australia
Hornsby Shire
Alliance of Girls' Schools Australasia